Basilides (2nd century BC), was a Stoic philosopher who denied the existence of incorporeal entities.

Nothing is known about the life of Basilides. From a table of contents in one of the medieval manuscripts, we know that he was listed in the missing part of Book VII of Diogenes Laërtius' Lives and Opinions of Eminent Philosophers. His position in the table of contents indicates that he lived around the time of Antipater of Tarsus in the 2nd century BC.

He is known principally from a passage in Sextus Empiricus, who notes that "Basilides and his followers thought no incorporeal [entity] exists." The specific context is the Stoic's theory of language.

Another (probably Stoic) philosopher called Basilides of Scythopolis (2nd century AD), is listed in the Chronicle of Jerome, as being as a teacher of Marcus Aurelius.

Notes

2nd-century BC Greek people
2nd-century BC philosophers
Hellenistic-era philosophers from Asia
Stoic philosophers